is a former Japanese football player. She played for Japan national team.

Club career
Shima was born on July 12, 1959. She played for FC Jinnan. The club won 1979 Empress's Cup. At the final, she scored a winning goal and was selected MVP awards.

National team career
In June 1981, Shima was selected Japan national team for 1981 AFC Championship. At this competition, on June 7, she debuted against Chinese Taipei. This match is Japan team first match in International A Match. She played in all 3 matches at this championship. In September, she also played against Italy. However Japan was defeated this match by a score of 0–9. This is the biggest defeat in the history of Japan national team. She played 4 games for Japan in 1981.

National team statistics

References

1959 births
Living people
Japanese women's footballers
Japan women's international footballers
Nissan FC Ladies players
Women's association footballers not categorized by position